The Hawaiian Ecosystems at Risk project (HEAR) was a government-funded project created to provide technology, methods, and information to decision-makers, resource managers, and the general public to help support effective science-based management of harmful non-native species (invasive species) in Hawaii and the Pacific Rim. Created in 1997, funding ended on 31 December 2012, and its website was last updated on 17 May 2013. One of the HEAR sub-websites, Pacific Island Ecosystems at Risk (PIER), was maintained on a strictly volunteer basis for a few years, until a final update on 2 June 2018.

Origin and history 
HEAR originated at the Haleakala Field Station (Maui, Hawaii) of the Pacific Island Ecosystems Research Center (PIERC) of the USGS's Biological Resources Division (formerly the National Biological Service) through the Pacific Cooperative Studies Unit (PSCU) based at the University of Hawaii Department of Botany.

Funding and support 
As of late 2012, the Hawaiian Ecosystems at Risk project was funded by the Hauoli Mau Loa Foundation and the U.S. Forest Service with support from the Pacific Cooperative Studies Unit (PCSU) of the University of Hawaii at Manoa.  Historically, HEAR had also received funding or support from the Pacific Basin Information Node (PBIN) of the National Biological Information Infrastructure (NBII) through the Pacific Island Ecosystems Research Center of USGS, the  Hawaii Conservation Studies Unit (HCSU) of the University of Hawaii at Hilo, Haleakala National Park, and the U.S. Fish and Wildlife Service.

Partnerships 
The Hawaiian Ecosystems at Risk project (HEAR) functioned by working collaboratively as a partnership with other organizations, including:
 U.S. Forest Service
 Pacific Cooperative Studies Unit of the University of Hawaii
 Pacific Basin Information Node (NBII)
 Pacific Island Ecosystems Research Center (USGS)
 Global Invasive Species Information Network

See also
Invasive species in Hawaii
Invasive species in the United States

References

External links
Hawaiian Ecosystems at Risk project official website (www.hear.org)
Pacific Island Ecosystems Research Center
Pacific Cooperative Studies Unit
University of Hawaii Department of Botany

Conservation projects in the United States
University of Hawaiʻi
Environment of Hawaii